Prarthana may refer to:

 Prayer in Hinduism, called , Sanskrit for prayer
 Prarthana Samaj, a Hindu reform movement and society
 Sangh Prarthana, a nationalist hymn in Sanskrit of the Rashtriya Swayamsevak Sangh

Arts and entertainment 
 Prarthana (1943 film), a Hindi social film
 Prarthana (1978 film), an Indian Malayalam film
 Adaraneeya Prarthana, a Sri Lankan film
 Prarthana TV, an Odia language spiritual TV channel

People 
Prarthana Behere (born 1983), Indian actress
Prarthana Thombare (born 1994), Indian tennis player
Prarthana Fardin Dighi, Bangladeshi film actress
Prarthana Indrajith  (born 2004), Indian playback singer

Places 
 Prarthana School in Padmanabhanagar, Bangalore, India

See also